Colin Gilbert is a TV producer.

Colin Gilbert may also refer to:

Colin Gilbert (chess player), winner of Welsh Chess Championship
Colin Gilbert (swimmer) who represented Canada at the 2014 Summer Youth Olympics